Pionosomus is a genus of true bugs belonging to the family Rhyparochromidae.

The species of this genus are found in Europe.

Species:
 Pionosomus abha Linnavuori, 1986 
 Pionosomus alticolus Lindberg, 1953

References

Rhyparochromidae